The njarka is a small fiddle made from a gourd, with one gut string, which is native to Mali. Ali Farka Touré was a notable njarka player.

References

Malian musical instruments
One-string fiddles